Trirhabda bacharidis, known generally as the groundselbush beetle or groundsel bush leaf beetle, is a species of skeletonizing leaf beetle in the family Chrysomelidae. It is found in Australia, North America, and Southern Asia.

References

Further reading

External links

 

Galerucinae
Articles created by Qbugbot
Beetles described in 1801